Muhamad Adam bin Mohd Norrodin (born 13 June 1998) is a Malaysian Grand Prix motorcycle racer.

Career

Early career
Adam raced in the Asia Talent Cup in 2014 and 2015, and the 2015 FIM CEV Moto3 Junior World Championship. He became the first rider from the former series to compete in the World Championship on his Moto3 début in 2016.

Moto3 World Championship

Drive M7 SIC Racing Team (2016)
Adam made his World Championship début in the Moto3 series in 2016, partnering Jakub Kornfeil on a Honda run by the Malaysian SIC Racing Team. He finished 28th in the Riders' Championship with a best finish of eleventh, in Argentina and Australia. In the former of these two races, he was on course for third place in wet weather conditions (behind compatriot Khairul Idham Pawi and Jorge Navarro), but crashed at the last corner whilst attempting to overtake Navarro. He pushed his damaged bike over the finish line but dropped eight places in the process.

SIC Racing Team (2017)
Adam remained with the SIC Racing Team for 2017, alongside 2015 Asia Talent Cup champion and World Championship rookie Ayumu Sasaki. He improved to seventeenth place in the riders' standings, with four top ten finishes and his first fastest lap, at his home race in Malaysia, despite crashing and rejoining the race.

Petronas Sprinta Racing (2018)
Adam continues with the SIC Racing Team (now renamed Petronas Sprinta Racing) with Sasaki for the 2018 season.

Career statistics

Asia Talent Cup

Races by year
(key) (Races in bold indicate pole position; races in italics indicate fastest lap)

Grand Prix motorcycle racing

By season

By class

Races by year
(key) (Races in bold indicate pole position; races in italics indicate fastest lap)

Supersport World Championship

By season

Races by year
(key) (Races in bold indicate pole position, races in italics indicate fastest lap)

 Season still in progress.

Asia Superbike 1000

Races by year
(key) (Races in bold indicate pole position; races in italics indicate fastest lap)

References

External links

 Profile on AsiaTalentCup.com

1998 births
Living people
Malaysian motorcycle racers
Moto3 World Championship riders
People from Johor
Moto2 World Championship riders
Supersport World Championship riders